Albirex Niigata is a Japanese football club based in Niigata. The following list contains all the footballers that have made over 100 league appearances for the club. Other players who are deemed to have played an important role for the club can be included, but the reason for their notability should be included in the 'Notes' column.

Players 
 Players whose name is in bold currently play for the club.
 (n/a) = Information not available
Statistics correct as of the end of the 2016 season

Notes 
 A.  
 B.  Kenji Komata was awarded the most valuable player of the 1996 Hokushin'etsu League.
 C.   Isao Homma is the all-time appearance record holder.
 D.  Moto Yamaguchi won the 2004 J. League Second Division as captain.
 E.  Marcus is third in the all time goalscoring tables with 51. Marcus also holds the club record of most league goals in one season with 32 in 2003.
 F.  Edmilson is the club's record goalscorer in the J. League with 62 goals.
 G.  Kengo Kawamata was awarded the 2013 J. League Best XI.
 H.  Léo Silva was awarded the 2014 J. League Best XI.

References 

General
 
 J. League data 

Players
 
Albirex Niigata
Association football player non-biographical articles